Sarnen is a small historic town, a municipality, and the capital of the canton of Obwalden situated on the northern shores of Lake Sarnen in Switzerland. It has a population of just over 10,000 and is surrounded by countryside and mountains. Sarnen is located 20 km south of Lucerne.

The official language of Sarnen is (the Swiss variety of Standard) German, but the main spoken language is the local variant of the Alemannic Swiss German dialect.

History 
Stone Age and Bronze Age finds show that the Sarnen valley was inhabited from the earliest times. Over the years Sarnen developed into an important trading center.

Geography 

The town is surrounded by mountain chains and a protected bog can be found nearby.

Of this area, about 39.0% is used for agricultural purposes, while 50.7% is forested. Of the rest of the land, 6.0% is settled (buildings or roads) and 4.3% is unproductive land. Of the agricultural land,  is used for orchards and vineyards,  is fields and grasslands and  consists of alpine grazing areas. Rivers and lakes cover  in the municipality.

The municipality is made up of 5 sections; Sarnen (population 5,984), Stalden (pop. 1,072), Wilen (pop. 1,234), Kägiswil (pop. 1,214) and Ramersberg (pop. 294).

Demographics 

, 14.5% of the population are resident foreign nationals. Over the last 4 years (2010-2014) the population has changed at a rate of 2.62%. The birth rate in the municipality, in 2014, was 9.2, while the death rate was 6.6 per thousand residents.

Most of the population speaks German (91.0%), with Italian being second most common (1.6%) and Albanian being third (1.6%).  the gender distribution of the population was 49.9% male and 50.1% female.

, children and teenagers (0–19 years old) make up 19.2% of the population, while adults (20–64 years old) are 62.1% and seniors (over 64 years old) make up 18.7%. In 2015 there were 4,418 single residents, 4,619 people who were married or in a civil partnership, 519 widows or widowers and 673 divorced residents.

 there are 3,452 households in Sarnen. In 2014 there were 4,338 private households in Sarnen with an average household size of 2.32 persons. Of the 1,957 inhabited buildings in the municipality, in 2000, about 47.6% were single family homes and 26.7% were multiple family buildings. Additionally, about 24.4% of the buildings were built before 1919, while 14.9% were built between 1991 and 2000. In 2013 the rate of construction of new housing units per 1000 residents was 5.75. The vacancy rate for the municipality, was 0.18%.

Historic population
The historical population is given in the following table:

Heritage sites of national significance
Sarnen is home to 10 sites that are Swiss heritage sites of national significance. These include three religious buildings; the Ossuary of St. Michael, the parish church of St. Peter and Paul, the Church of St. Martin. Two houses and a tower, the double house am Grund and Grundacher and the Hexenturm are on the list. The remainder of the list contains the Cantonal Rathaus, the musical collection of the Frauenkloster, the Landenberg armory and the State Archives of Obwalden. The entire small city of Sarnen, the hamlet of Ramersberg and the Kirchhofen area are part of the Inventory of Swiss Heritage Sites.

Sarnen today 

The town of Sarnen has been experiencing steady growth over the past years. It has become more attractive due to its proximity to Lucerne. Many commuters work in Lucerne and use the motorway or railway service to get to work.

Among companies active in Sarnen include SIKA AG (Specialty Chemicals), Leister Technologies (heated-air tools) and Nahrin AG (healthy nutrition).

Economy
Sarnen is a small sized regional center.

, there were a total of 8,182 people employed in the municipality. Of these, 366 people worked in 144 businesses in the primary economic sector. The secondary sector employed 2,058 workers in 151 separate businesses. In 2014 a total of 1,176 employees worked in 146 small companies (less than 50 employees). There were 4 mid sized businesses with 561 employees and 1 large business which employed 321 people. Finally, the tertiary sector provided 5,758 jobs in 987 businesses. There were 69 small businesses with a total of 1,746 employees, 10 mid sized businesses with a total of 963 employees and one large business with a total of 479 employees. In 2014 a total of 5.8% of the population received social assistance.

In 2015 local hotels had a total of 57,837 overnight stays, of which 34.3% were international visitors.

Politics
In the 2015 federal election a small, local party received 65.6% of the vote, compared to 57.6% in 2011. The remainder of the vote (34.4%) went to the SVP, which received 42.4% in 2011. In the federal election, a total of 4,505 votes were cast, and the voter turnout was 61.0%.

In the 2007 federal election the most popular party was the CVP which received 34.8% of the vote. The next three most popular parties were the SVP (30%), the Other (22.7%) and the SPS (12.6%).

Education
In Sarnen about 68.6% of the population (between age 25–64) have completed either non-mandatory upper secondary education or additional higher education (either university or a Fachhochschule).

Religion
, the religious membership of the municipality was; 7,403 or 74.7% are Roman Catholic, while 779 or 7.9% belonged to the Swiss Reformed Church. Of the rest of the population, there are 39 individuals (or about 0.39% of the population) who belong to the Christian Catholic faith. There are 1,687 individuals (or about 17.03% of the population) who belong to another church (not listed on the census) or no church.

Transportation

Road 
The highway A8 passes by Sarnen.

Railway 
Giswil is served by Sarnen station on the Brünig line, an inter-regional narrow-gauge railway from Interlaken to Lucerne. The hourly InterRegio train between Interlaken and Lucerne stops at the station, as does the half-hourly Lucerne S-Bahn S5 service between Giswil and Lucerne.

Airplane 
Switzerland has three major international airports: Geneva, Zurich and Basel. Both Basel (at 125 km) and Zurich (90 km) airports are closer to Sarnen than Geneva airport (260 km). The journey from either airport by road takes from about 1 h to 1 hour 20 minutes.

Geneva and Zurich airports have built-in railway stations. The journey from Zurich takes between 1 h 30 min and 1 h 55 min depending on train connections.

Weather 
Sarnen has an average of 139.3 days of rain per year and on average receives  of precipitation. During this month there is precipitation for an average of 13.6 days. The month with the most days of precipitation is June, with an average of 14.6, but with only  of precipitation.

Crime
In 2014 the crime rate, of the over 200 crimes listed in the Swiss Criminal Code (running from murder, robbery and assault to accepting bribes and election fraud), in Sarnen was 65.6 per thousand residents, which is very close to the national rate of 64.6. During the same period, the rate of drug crimes was 4.9 per thousand residents. This rate is about half the national rate. The rate of violations of immigration, visa and work permit laws was 1.0 per thousand residents, or about 20.4% of the national rate.

Notable people 
 Nicholas of Flüe (1598 – 1649), theologian and abbot of Wettingen
 Herman Fanger (1895 in Sarnen – 1971) a Swiss-born American inventor of the coaxial speaker
 Hans Vollenweider (1908 – 1940 in Sarnen) a Swiss criminal, the last person to be sentenced to death by a civilian court in Switzerland, executed shortly after
 Franz Bucher (born 1940 in Sarnen) a Swiss artist, produces paintings, drawings, woodcuts, etchings, sculptural objects, reliefs, murals and stained glass
 Daniel Vacek (born 1971) a former tennis player from Czechoslovakia, represented his country at the 1996 Summer Olympics, lives in Sarnen
 Jonas Omlin (born 1994 in Sarnen) a Swiss football goalkeeper, about 60 club caps
 Viola Calligaris (born 1996 in Sarnen) a Swiss footballer who plays as a midfielder

References

External links 
 Sarnen Official site 

 Local companies:
 Sarna Polymer Holding
 Nahrin AG

 
Cantonal capitals of Switzerland
Cities in Switzerland
Municipalities of Obwalden
Sarnen (capital)